Jack McKenzie (born 9 March 1942) is a Scottish actor. He was born in Edinburgh and was educated at George Heriot's School, after which he joined the Royal Marines at the age of fifteen. He subsequently joined Lothians and Peebles Constabulary and later transferred to Edinburgh City Police.

Film 
 Valentino (Ken Russell) (1977) - (uncredited)
 A Bridge Too Far (Richard Attenborough) (1977) - Soldier #17
 Dominique (Michael Anderson) (1979) - John, 1st Chauffeur
 Star Wars: Episode V - The Empire Strikes Back (Irvin Kershner) (1980) - Cal Alder (Rebel Force Deck Lieutenant)
 Gandhi (Richard Attenborough) (1982) - Major at Aga Khan Palace
 The Zero Option (Sarah Hellings) (1988) - Dunstan
 Beyond Bedlam (Vadim Jean) (1994) - DCI Clery
 Clockwork Mice (Vadim Jean) (1995) - CID 1
 The End Of The Affair (Neil Jordan) (1999) - Chief Engineer
 The Calling (Richard Caesar) (2000) - Norman 
 The Love We Seek (Samuel Roffey)
 The House That Jack Built (2018) - Sonny - Zentropa Films - Lars Von Trier

Television 
 Sutherland's Law (1973-1975) - Police sergeant / Officer in Charge / PC Merengie
 The Sweeney (1975) - Len
 Space 1999 (1976) - Technician (2 episodes)
 The Other One (1977) - Bill Burke
 Return of the Saint (1978) - Marek
 Secret Army (1979) - Major Neil Turner
 Blake's 7 (1980) - Patar
The Gentle Touch (1980) -  Hamish
 The Professionals (1980) - Rose
 Barriers (1981) - Sportsmaster
 The Treachery Game (1981) - Alec Marsh
 Blood Money (1981) - Det. Insp. Perry
 Angels (1982) - Mr. McGraw
The Mad Death (1983) - Fergus
 Skorpion (1983) - Chief Insp. Perry
 Play for Today - Last Love (1983) - Gerald Castle
 Taggart (1986-2001) - Jim Redpath / David Laing / Alan Donald
 The Collectors (1986) - Calvin Simpson
 Piece of Cake (1988) - 'Ram' Ramsey
 Science Fiction - The Smoking Gun (1990)
 Heartbeat (1993) - Mr. Brown
 Bugs (1995) - Host
 Bernard's Watch (1998-2001) - Postman
 The Bill (1998) - Mack
 EastEnders (2010) - Donald
 Emmerdale (2015) - Tom
 " Home Alone" (2016) (Discovery Channel) Jeff Young - October Films

Theatre 
 Gothenburg English Studio Theatre, The Woman In Black
 The Watermill Theatre, Hobson's Choice
 Royal National Theatre, The Misanthrope, Engaged and Into The Mouths Of Crabs
 Wintershall, Guildford, The Passion and The Life of Christ (4 seasons)
 Redgrave Theatre, Farnham, MacBeth, Who Killed Cock Robin, The Trial of Lady Chatterley
 Farnham Maltings, Sorry To Spoil Your Daughter's Birthday
 Pantomimes at Guildford Civic Hall and Bracknell

Musical theatre 
The English Theatre, Frankfurt, City of Angels
Brighton Festival, Paul - A Strange kind of Hero
First Major UK and Ireland Tour of Dirty Dancing

References

External links
 
 Jack McKenzie at Aveleyman (Credits incomplete)
 Jack McKenzie at Theatricalia

1942 births
Living people
People educated at George Heriot's School
Scottish police officers
Royal Marines ranks
Male actors from Edinburgh
Scottish male television actors
Scottish male film actors
20th-century Scottish male actors
21st-century Scottish male actors